Zeče pri Bučah is a settlement west of Buče in the Municipality of Kozje in eastern Slovenia. The municipality is included in the Savinja Statistical Region and the entire area is part of the historical region of Styria.

Name
The name of the settlement was changed from Zeče to Zeče pri Bučah in 1953.

References

External links
 Zeče pri Bučah on Geopedia

Populated places in the Municipality of Kozje